Sergiu Sîrbu, sometimes written Sârbu (born 15 September 1960, in Chișinău) is a Moldovan football manager and former footballer.

On 2 July 1991, he represented Moldova in its first international match, a loss 2–4 to Georgia. This was his only international match.

Manager career 
 1992–1993 – Zimbru Chișinău
 2003 – Zimbru Chișinău
 2006–2007 – FC Iskra-Stal
 2008–2009 – FC Iskra-Stal (assistant)
 2010 – Rapid Ghidighici
 2011 – Rapid Ghidighici (assistant)
 2011–2012 – Zimbru Chișinău (assistant)
 2012 – Zimbru Chișinău (interim coach)

Honours

Manager
Zimbru Chișinău
Moldovan National Division (3): 1992, 1992-1993, 1993-1994

References

External links
 
 
 
 

1960 births
Living people
Moldovan footballers
Moldova international footballers
Soviet footballers
FC Zimbru Chișinău players
Moldovan football managers
Footballers from Chișinău
FC Zimbru Chișinău managers
Association football midfielders
Moldovan Super Liga managers